Ian John Bond (born 8 June 1973) is an English international lawn and indoor bowler.

Bond plays for the Exonia indoor bowls club and the Crediton outdoor bowls club. He won the Pairs title at the 2008 World Indoor Bowls Championship and repeated the feat securing the 2010 World Indoor Bowls Championship whilst partnering Andy Thomson on both occasions.

Other achievements include winning the -
2001 BUPA Care Homes Open
2003 Scottish Masters
2005 Scottish International Open 2005
2010 World Matchplay

References

External links
 
 

1973 births
Living people
English male bowls players
Indoor Bowls World Champions
Commonwealth Games medallists in lawn bowls
Commonwealth Games silver medallists for England
Bowls players at the 2006 Commonwealth Games
Medallists at the 2006 Commonwealth Games